This is a list of current governors of the provinces of Thailand.

List

Special administrative areas

Provinces

References 

Thailand